(), known as , commonly referred to as MC Oran for short, is a football club based in Oran, Algeria. Founded on 1 January 1917 and formed again on 14 May 1946, the club was known as Mouloudia Chaâbia Ouahrania from 1971 to 1977, Mouloudia Pétroliers d'Oran (MP Oran for a short) from 1977 to 1987 and Mouloudia d'Oran from 1987 to 1989. The club colours are red and white. Their home stadium, Ahmed Zabana Stadium, has a capacity of 40,000 spectators. The club is currently playing in the Algerian Ligue Professionnelle 1.

Until 2008, MC Oran was the only club in Algeria to have participated in every single season of the first division since its inception in 1962. However, the club was relegated at the end of the 2007–08 season but returned after just one season in the Algerian Championnat National 1.

History

Foundation of the first Mouloudia (1917)
The Mouloudia Club Musulman Oranais (MCM Oran) was founded and declared on 1 January 1917 in Medina Jedida but the declaration was approved by the French authorities on 4 December 1919 after changing the home place of the club. The club was named Mouloudia referring to the Mawlid (the birth of the prophet Muhammad) hence the name Mouloudia of Mawlid.

In 1924, the club merged with Hamidia Club Musulman Oranais (HCM Oran), this club was founded in 1921. And in 1934, the club's name return to Mouloudia Club Musulman Oranais.
In 1939, the club stopped his sport activities because the World War II until the end of the war in 1945.

In 1946, Ali Bentouti a former player and member of MCM Oran decided to form the club under the name of Mouloudia Club Oranais on 14 May 1946.

Formation (1946–1962)

The Mouloudia Club Oranais began on May 14, 1946, when nationalists activists formed the team of Mouloudia Club Oranais, a Muslim club in the district of El Hamri (former Lamur) in Oran to compete with European clubs at a time when Algeria was a French district (French Algeria). Mohamed Bessol, one of the founding members was a player, coach, and general secretary of the club until 1967. Other founding members were Ali Bentouti, Omar Abouna, Redouane Serik Boutaleb, and also Mohamed Serradj, Ali Tounsi, Belaid Bachir, Bensenouci Mahi, Bloufa Benhadad, Mahmoud Benahmed, Miloud Bendraou, Miloud Cherigui, Ali Aroumia, Kada Fali.

The founding ceremony of Mouloudia was assisted by Cheïkh Saïd Zamouchi, delegated by Sheikh Si Tayeb Al Mahaji (imam, writer and member of the Association of Algerian Muslim Ulema) led by Sheikh Abdelhamid Ben Badis.

Mouloudia Club Oranais began his first competition, in the 1946–47 season in the third division of the regional championship of the League of Oran (3F/O) after inscription in the France Football Federation.
The course of the club from 1946 to 1956 is unknown. And from 1956 to 1962 (the independence year of Algeria), MC Oran block all its sports activities by order of the FLN because Algerian War.

After independence (1962–1977)

The Mouloudia Club Oranais start in the first competition of Algeria independent in 1962–63 season on high level, it qualified for the final tournament of the championship of the first two seasons, 1962–63 and 1963–64 which were composed of three groups (Algiers, Oran and Constantine). It finished second in the group of Oran in both seasons, unfortunately not a qualifying place for the semi-finals, but this place already earned the team a status of a great club. In the following seasons, it will be runner-up twice consecutively in 1968 and 1969 were the legendary striker Abdelkader Fréha was Algerian championship top scorer in both seasons.

In the 1970s and with more experienced players such as Abdelkader Fréha, Abdellah Kechra, Lahouari Beddiar and Miloud Hadefi, the Mouloudia d'Oran will bring back for the season 1970–71 the famous Portuguese coach Carlos Gomes who will say a phrase that will remain famous in the annals of the national football "Give me the MCO and Fréha and I will be champion of Algeria". The Mouloudia will win its first title of its history, the supreme title of champion of Algeria for the season 1970–71. Abdelkader Fréha and Noureddine "Mehdi" Hamel will finish top scorers each one this year and the club will finish with the best attack of the championship, a total dominance for this season.

Four years later after winning the first Algeria title in 1971, MC Oran won the first Algerian Cup in 1975, beating the MO Constantine in the final on 19 June in Algiers at the Stade du 5 Juillet in front of 70,000 spectators, It finish the competition with a record of the best attack of the time in the cup competition.

Sport reform and the era of the great MP Oran (1977–1989)

In 1977, Algerian government decided to reform national sports, it was applied throughout the country, the sports clubs are supported by the national societies and become semi-professionals. Naftal (National Society of Marketing and Distribution of Petroleum Products) sponsors the club. Mouloudia changed its name and became Mouloudia Pétroliers d'Oran (MP Oran). Under the leadership of coach Saïd Amara, and in addition to grandiose players like Sid Ahmed Belkedrouci (top scorer in the championship in 1975), the team is reinforced by talented players like Lakhdar Belloumi or Tedj Bensaoula and finished third in 1979. She is also semi-finalist of the Algerian Cup in 1978 and 1979 and Lakhdar Belloumi was elected top scorer of the championship in 1979.

During the 1980s, and particularly from 1983 onwards, a new generation of players such as Benyagoub Sebbah, Habib Benmimoun, Mourad Meziane, Bachir Mecheri, Tahar Chérif El-Ouazzani, wins the Algerian Cup on two consecutive occasions in 1984 and 1985, which will open the doors to the African Cup Winners' Cup in 1985 and 1986. And with the reinforcement of the team by Nacerdine Drid (1986), Karim Maroc (1987) and the return of Lakhdar Belloumi in 1987, the team becomes more stronger and become semi-finalist of Algerian Cup in 1986, 1988 and 1989 and Algerian Championship runners-up in 1987 but in 1988, the team wins the supreme title of champion of Algeria.

Favour to this title, the Mouloudia takes part in the African Cup of champions clubs in 1989 and loses a final on penalties well-deserved after a total domination of the competition to the return match at the Stade Ahmed Zabana against Raja Casablanca in front of 40,000 spectators.

National domination (1990–2000)
The early 1990s marked the end of the sport reform. Consequently, Naftal ceases to sponsor the club which takes its former name of Mouloudia Club Oranais. The club has always played the leading roles at national and international level since 1962, but in the 1990s he dominated national football with a new generation, Abdelhafid Tasfaout, Sid Ahmed Zerrouki, Ali Meçabih supported by experienced players such as Tahar Chérif El-Ouazzani or Omar Belatoui. The decade begins with the two championships won consecutively in 1992 and 1993 with Abdelhafid Tasfaout best scorer in both seasons. The Mouloudia will be four times Algerian championship runners-up in 1995, 1996, 1997 and 2000 and will win in 1996 an historic double Algerian Cup and League Cup. It will also be a finalist in the Algerian Supercup in 1992, the Algeria Cup in 1998 and the League Cup in 2000.

At the international level, the club will win the Arab Cup Winners' Cup twice in 1997 and 1998, once the Arab Super Cup in 1999 and will be semi-finalist of the African Cup of Champions in 1994 and quarter-finalist twice in the CAF Cup in 1996 and the African Cup Winners' Cup in 1997.

The great depression (2000–2010)
The decade of the 2000s will be the worst in the history of MC Oran. In addition a lot of conflicts especially in administration and management when the club has not won any title and he often plays the maintenance against relegation, this decade will be marked by two major milestones.

First fact is the Conflict of Elimam-Djebbari of 9 October 2003 in Sidi Bel Abbès during a match of the 2002-2003 Algeria Championship between MC Oran and NA Hussein Dey. The Mouloudia arrived at the stadium with two teams, two technical staff and two coaches, presided by two presidents Kacem Elimam and Youcef Djebbari, the match was canceled and the victory was returned to NA Hussein Dey.

The second fact was the Relegation in D2 in 2008. The club relegated for the first time in its history in Division 2 during the 2007–2008 season. This relegation was a shock to the entire population of Oran, and riots broke out in the city for three days, causing considerable material damage estimated at around 7.5 billion centimes of DA, hundreds of arrests and hospitalizations that forced the authorities to use the great means to stop this tragedy. But the club accedes after only one year in D1 at the 2008–09 season. The Mouloudia still holds the national record of presence in the first division.

Professionalism with failure in managements (2010–2023)

The year 2010 will be marked by the launch of the first professional championship encompassing the first and second divisions.
On 27 September 2012, the National Society of Marketing and Distribution of Petroleum Products Naftal decided to a probable return to sponsoring the MC Oran after an absence of 24 years. As past, Naftal will sponsoring the all sport's sections of the Mouloudia Club Oranais. This initiative is a part of the development of national sport, especially that MC Oran is one of the largest national and continental omnisports club. However the agreement was not concluded.
In 2014 Ahmed "Baba" Belhadj is elected new president of the club but five years passed without any title for the club.

On 6 January 2019, the Hyproc Shipping Company, a firm of the petroleum company Sonatrach based in Arzew signed a protocol and became the club's sponsor. This initiative became after a long time of waiting the petroleum firm Naftal it's nine years ago. However same as Naftal, no final contract was concluded and Hyproc same as Naftal became a minor sponsors only.

A new era of the club (2023-present)
A new appeal has been launched by the Wali of Oran Saïd Sayoud to the shareholders of the société sportive par actions (SSPA) of MC Oran in order to withdraw their share in the said company in favor of the club sportif amateur (CSA) to overcome the crisis that smolders. According to the same official, the SSPA/MCO is already in a “bankruptcy situation”, deploring the attitude of the shareholders who have completely abandoned the club, showing no desire to help it get out of the chaotic situation in which it is struggling. for quite some time.

On 16 January 2023, Youcef Djebbari resigned as club president during the extraordinary general meeting (AGEX) of the sports company by shares (SSPA) of the club. On February 5, during a meeting at the headquarters of the wilaya with the shareholders of the club, the wali Saïd Sayoud asks shareholders to give up their shares and leave the club. He also asks to appoint Bachir Sebaâ at the head of the CSA / MCO and also to temporarily chair the SSPA / MCO. On February 6, Bachir Sebaâ takes up his post as manager of the club.

On 21 February 2023, in a statement made public on the official page of “the wilaya of Oran”, the wali declared his official withdrawal and his non-interference in the affairs of the MCO team. Despite the efforts and sincere intentions he has deployed, he has not, however, seen any real and serious will on the part of the club's leaders leading to a professional sporting project which reflects the ambitions of the supporters to see their club heart managed mat a national enterprise. However on March 1st, the temporary responsable of the club Bachir Sebaâ declared that the wali Saïd Sayoud will never abandon the club until all the shareholders have left and he is out of his crisis. And on March 7, the wali declared the club will have a national company before the end of the season.

On 14 March 2023, during the 7th Symposium of the Algerian Gas Industry Association in the prestigious Meridian Hostel in Oran, with the presence of the wali M. Saïd Sayoud, M. Mohamed Hamel, Secretary General of the Gas Exporting Countries Forum and M. Toufik Hakkar, the Chief Executive Officer of Sonatrach, and also some members of the club such us Bachir Sebaâ the president of the CSA/MCO and Omar Belatoui the coach of the team. It was declared officialy that Hyproc Shipping Company, a subsidiary of sonatrach which is a company specializing in the maritime transport of hydrocarbons based in Oran will become the majority shareholder and the owner of the club.

On 17 March 2023, the wali Saïd Sayoud declared the cessation of all the shareholders of their shares for the benefit of the sport amateur club (CSA) and the club will enter in a new era with a new owner, Hyproc Shipping Company.

Crests and kits

Historical crests
MC Oran has had several crests in its history. The first, adopted in the 70th. The second crest was used from the 1977 reform when the national companies took the different Algerians clubs from 1977 to 1988, MC Oran was taken by Naftal company and was called MP Oran (Mouloudia Pétrolière d'Oran), From 1988, the national companies retired from the Clubs, the club took its old name MC Oran (Mouloudia Club Oranais), however there were various crests from this year until now but only one crest was more famous and more credible.

Historical kits

MC Oran play with white kits with a few red color at home, and with red kits with a few white color at away games.

Grounds

The club, one of the most popular in Algeria, plays at the Ahmed Zabana Stadium (40,000 capacity), in the popular district of El Hamri.  Sometimes the team play in Habib Bouakeul Stadium which is the 2nd stadium of the city with a capacity of 20,000.  Now a new and modern stadium is being constructed with a capacity of 40,000 which is called Olympic Stadium of Oran.

Supports

MC Oran is one of the most popular club of the country, it fans are called Hamraoua in reference to the historical Neighborhoods El Hamri that saw the foundation of the club. There are also some associations of fans and there are called Ultras Red Castle, Ultras Leones Rey and Ultras Red King.

Rivalries
ASM Oran
Before independence in 1962, Oran was known by several big derbies because there were several big clubs as CAL Oran, CDJ Oran, USM Oran, AS Marine d'Oran, FC Oran. After independence, other clubs began to dominate the Oranese and Algerian football as MC Oran, ASM Oran, SCM Oran and RCG Oran and many derbies appeared. The most famous is called Oran derby or Mouloudia & Jamîiya derby, it's the biggest rivalry of Oran since independence in 1962 played between MC Oran and ASM Oran.

CR Belouizdad
Algerian Clasico 
It's the rivalry of all the records and it's called the MCO CRB Clasico or the Division one Clasico. First between two clubs holding the record of seasons played (one season only missed each), record of number of matches played between them (more than 100 games in Ligue 1), record of goals scored and many other records.

MC Alger
This rivalry is between the greatest club of the capital Algiers and the greatest club of the second city Oran. It's called the Mouloudia clasico.

ES Sétif
Big rivalry between two Algerian big teams since independence. It's called MCO ESS rivalry or East West rivalry.

Ownership and finances
On 6 January 2019, the Algerian petroleum firm Hyproc Shipping Company signed a primary contract to become the principal sponsor of the club but no final contract was concluded and Hyproc remains a simple sponsor of the club.

Current kit supplier, shirt sponsors and sponsor
The principal sponsors of the club during the current season are:

Historical kit suppliers, shirt sponsors and sponsors

Players

Algerian teams are limited to two foreign players. The squad list includes only the principal nationality of each player;

Current squad
As of 25 August 2022.

Reserve Squad
Below the list of the reserve squad:

Notable players
MC Oran have many notable former players who have represented MC Oran in league and international competition since the club's foundation in 1946. To appear in the section below, a player must have played in at least 100 official matches for the club or represented the national team for which the player is eligible during his stint with MC Oran or following his departure.

For notable players see List of MC Oran players.
For details on former players see :Category:MC Oran players.

Personnel

Current technical staff

Managerial history

Presidents
On 8 October 2012, Larbi Abdelilah is named temporary president of SSPA MC Oran. Abdelilah will manage the administrative affairs of the club until the supposal arrival of officials Naftal.
On 3 June 2014, Ahmed "Baba" Belhadj is named a new president of the club, he succeeded Youcef Djebbari.

Honours

MC Oran is one of the most successful teams of Algeria.

Domestic competitions
Algerian Ligue 1
Winners (4): 1970–71, 1987–88, 1991–92, 1992–93
Runners-up (9): 1967–68, 1968–69, 1984–85, 1986–87, 1989–90, 1994–95, 1995–96, 1996–97, 1999–00

Algerian Cup
Winners (4): 1974–75, 1983–84, 1984–85, 1995–96
Runners-up (2): 1997–98, 2001–02

Algerian Super Cup
Runners-up (1): 1992

Algerian League Cup
Winners (1): 1995–96
Runners-up (1): 1999–00

International competitions
African Cup of Champions Clubs / CAF Champions League
Runners-up (1): 1989

Regional competitions
Arab Cup Winners' Cup
Winners (2): 1997, 1998
Arab Super Cup
Winners (1): 1999
Arab Cup of Champions Clubs / Arab Club Championship
Runners-up (1): 2001

Performance in CAF competitions

 African Cup of Champions Clubs / CAF Champions League: 3 appearances
The club have 3 appearances in African Cup of Champions Clubs from 1989 to 1994.

1989 – Finalist
1993 – Quarter-finals
1994 – Semi-finals

CAF Confederation Cup: 2 appearances
2005 – Second round
2016 – Second round

CAF Cup: 2 appearances
1996 – Quarter-finals
1998 – First round

African Cup Winners' Cup: 3 appearances
1985 – Second round
1986 – Second round
1997 – Quarter-finals

International statistics
CAF statistics

UAFA statistics

IFFHS rankings

African club of century ranking
MC Oran was ranked by IFFHS at the 50th best African club of the 20th century.

See also
List of football clubs in Algeria

Notes & references

Notes

References

External links

 
Football clubs in Algeria
Football clubs in Oran
Association football clubs established in 1917
Algerian Ligue Professionnelle 1 clubs
1917 establishments in Algeria
Sports clubs in Algeria